Jordan Henri (born 30 April 1993) is a Belgian footballer who currently plays for La Louvière as a winger.

Career
In August 2017, Henri joined Olympic Charleroi. He played for the club for two years, before joining La Louvière.

References

External links

1993 births
Living people
Belgian footballers
Association football midfielders
UR La Louvière Centre players
A.F.C. Tubize players
R. Olympic Charleroi Châtelet Farciennes players
R.A.A. Louviéroise players
Challenger Pro League players